Karina Manta (born March 20, 1996) is an American former competitive ice dancer.

Early life 
Manta was born on March 20, 1996, in Olympia, Washington. She began figure skating in 2002.

Career 
Manta previously competed in ice dance with Jonathan Thompson. Manta has partnered with ice dancer Joseph Johnson since 2013. The team is coached by Patti Gottwein in Colorado Springs. Manta and Johnson received their first Grand Prix assignment in 2018, competing at Skate America. They finished in 10th place with a total score of 139.33.

On April 18, 2019, Manta announced that she was stepping away from competitive figure skating. She and Johnson plan to move to Montreal in June and join Cirque du Soleil.

In 2020, it was announced that Manta would join the cast of ITV's Dancing On Ice. During the thirteenth series, she was a replacement partner for Graham Bell, whose original partner, fellow newcomer Yebin Mok, was injured during training. Bell and Manta were voted off during Week 3. Manta won the fourteenth series with Regan Gascoigne.

Personal life 
As of 2018, Manta is a college student. In 2018, she came out as bisexual in a video accompanied by her girlfriend. This made her the first female figure skater competing on behalf of Team USA to come out.

Programs

Competitive Highlights 
GP: Grand Prix; CS: Challenger Series

(with Joe Johnson)

References 

American female ice dancers
1996 births
LGBT figure skaters
American LGBT sportspeople
Bisexual sportspeople
Bisexual women
Living people
LGBT dancers
21st-century American women
LGBT people from Washington (state)